Tzami Tzentit (Turkish:           Greek: Τζαμί Τζεντίτ), is a district of the municipality of Limassol.

Location 
It borders Tsiflikoudia to the west, Arnaoutogitonia to the northwest, Katholiki to the northeast, Ayia Napa to the east and Agios Antonios to the south. Its southeastern part is coastal. The old port of Limassol was built on this site. In its place today is a fishing port with tourist and entertainment facilities.

History 
The Tzami Tzentit area was the largest Turkish Cypriot district of Limassol since the beginning of Turkish rule. It was the center of the Turkish Cypriot trade, economic and educational activities in Limassol. Tzami means Mosque and the area got its name from the Tzami Tzentit Mosque in Limassol.

Religious and buildings of historic interest 
An important building in the district is the Tzentit Mosque (Friday Mosque). It is located on the banks of the river Garyllis. It was built in 1835 by Hatzi Ibrahim Aga (known as Koproulou), after promising to build a temple in the area if he returned safely from the battle of Accra in Palestine. The mosque was destroyed in 1894 due to flooding of the river.

It was rebuilt in 1909.

The Tzentit Mosque is also known as Cami-i Cedit (New Mosque) or Koproulou Ibrahim Mosque or Camisi Dere (Stream Mosque).

June 2020 
Vandalism with Molotov cocktails took place, with racist statements left on walls. Tzentit Mosque was attacked with molotov bombs on 1 June 2020, same night racist statements were sprayed on the walls. The incident was mentioned in the Turkish newspaper Hürriyet and discussed by all political parties in Cyprus Republic and by the president of Northern Cyprus.  The Mayor of Limassol next day assured that actions will be taken so that such incidents cannot easily take place in future.

In addition, the medieval castle of Limassol is located within the administrative boundaries of the district.

Area Map

References

Limassol